George Brodie was a 19th-century Member of Parliament in Otago, New Zealand.

He represented the Gold Fields electorate from 1863 to 1866, when he retired. In December 1865, he served on the Executive Council of the Otago Province.

References

Members of the New Zealand House of Representatives
Year of death missing
Year of birth missing
New Zealand MPs for South Island electorates
Members of Otago provincial executive councils
19th-century New Zealand politicians
People of the Otago Gold Rush